Anti-patriotism is the ideology that opposes patriotism; it usually refers to those with cosmopolitan views and is usually of an internationalist and anti-nationalist nature as well. Normally, anti-patriotism stems from the belief that patriotism is wrong since people born in a country, whether they like it or not and regardless of their individuality, are encouraged to love the country or sacrifice themselves for it; consequently, people who oppose patriotism may oppose its perceived authoritarianism, while others may believe that patriotism may lead to war because of geopolitical disputes. Usually, this term is used in a pejorative way by those who defend patriotism or nationalism, and terms such as cosmopolitanism or world citizenship may be used to avoid the bias that comes from the typical usage of the words anti-nationalism or anti-nationalist. The idea of multiple cultures intertwined has also been questioned as anti-patriotic, but mainly in smaller social communities: colleges, universities, etc.
The Espionage Act of 1917 and the Sedition Act of 1918 were pieces of legislation in the United States that were passed after it entered World War I, to incriminate individuals who attempted to impede the war effort. Those who did so were punished and believed to be performing acts of anti-patriotism.

Anarchist opposition to patriotism 
Anarchists, most notably anarcho-communists, tend to oppose patriotism for several reasons, including:

 The belief in equality for all people
 The use of patriotism to subjugate the working class
 The association between patriotism and militarism
 The use of patriotism to encourage loyalty to the state

Emma Goldman stated:Indeed, conceit, arrogance, and egotism are the essentials of patriotism. Let me illustrate. Patriotism assumes that our globe is divided into little spots, each one surrounded by an iron gate. Those who have had the fortune of being born on some particular spot, consider themselves better, nobler, grander, more intelligent than the living beings inhabiting any other spot. It is, therefore, the duty of everyone living on that chosen spot to fight, kill, and die in the attempt to impose his superiority upon all the others.The individualist anarchist Hans Ryner also expressed his opposition to patriotism:Anti-patriotism was the reaction of reason and sentiment the moment patriotism reigned. It took on diverse forms in accordance with the degree to which it relied more or less consciously on individualism, on love for all men, on love for one man (as with Camille, the sister of the Horatii), or even on a reasoned or sentimental preference for the laws and morals of a foreign country.

Anti-patriotism in Japan 
Kōtoku Shūsui, a famous Japanese anarchist of the late 19th/early 20th century, devoted a large section of his widely read Imperialism, Monster of the Twentieth Century to a condemnation of patriotism.  One of the many arguments is based on the Confucian value of empathy: "I am as convinced as Mencius that any man would rush without hesitation to rescue a child who was about to fall into a well... A human being moved by such selfless love and charity does not pause to think whether the child is a family member or a close relative.  When he rescues the child from danger, he does not even ask himself whether the child is his own or belongs to another."  Patriotism is used to dehumanize others who we would naturally have empathy for.  He argues, "[P]atriotism is a discriminating and arbitrary sentiment confined to those who belong to a single nation state or live together within common national borders", a sentiment cultivated and used by militarists in their drive for war.

Anti-patriotism in Europe 
Karl Marx famously stated that "The working men have no country" and that "the supremacy of the proletariat will cause them [national differences] to vanish still faster." The same view is promoted by present-day Trotskyists such as Alan Woods, who is "in favour of tearing down all frontiers and creating a socialist world commonwealth."

Examples of US Supreme Court cases that deal with anti-patriotism

Texas v. Johnson (1989) 
During a protest outside the Republican Party’s 1984 national convention, Gregory Johnson burned an American flag, he was then arrested and charged with violating a state law. Johnson asserted that his right to burn the American flag was protected by the First Amendment. The case was then brought to the United States Supreme Court. The Supreme Court ruled by a 5–4 decision that Johnson’s conviction was unconstitutional. Justice William Brennan, in his majority opinion asserted that the act of burning a flag was considered an expressive activity which is protected by the First Amendment. Although, four members of the Supreme Court argued that his actions were forms of anti-patriotism, and therefore punishable and unprotected by the First Amendment.

In Chief Justice William Rehnquist's dissenting opinion he asserted that the American flag is a visible symbol for the country and therefore should be preserved. Rehnquist argued that burning the flag expressed disapproval and anti-patriotism for the nation’s policy, and was therefore a symbolic desecration of the U.S. in its entirety.

Schenck v. United States (1919) 
The Espionage Act of 1917 was a piece of legislation that was passed to punish and criminalize individuals who impeded the war effort by interfering with military recruitment and supporting foreign enemies; the act was passed shortly after the U.S. declared war on Germany. Some opposed the war, specifically the American Socialist Party, who publicly declared their disapproval. Charles Schenck was the general secretary for the American Socialist Party, who opposed the war and exhibited that disapproval by distributing pamphlets that vilified Woodrow Wilson’s administration and insisted that the draft was unconstitutional. The court unanimously ruled that Schenck’s distribution of the pamphlets posed a clear and present danger to the national security of the U.S. The court ruled that because of this, his speech was not protected by the First Amendment and was simultaneously in violation of the Espionage Act of 1917. The act of deterring individuals from registering for the draft during wartime can be seen as an act of anti-patriotism as it condemns the U.S. government.

Abrams v. United States (1919) 
In this case, the Supreme Court of the United States ruled that those who provoked and promoted resistance to the war were in direct violation of the Espionage Act, and their speech was not protected by the First Amendment. The provocation of a riot and strike in order to hurt the war effort was seen as an act of anti-patriotism. Abrams attempted to make the workers in ammunition factories go on strike. Therefore, because Abrams acted in a way that was directly attempting to damage the war effort of the U.S., his actions can be seen as acts of anti-patriotism. Justice Oliver Wendell Holmes argued that this act did not present a clear and present danger to national security and free speech should not be limited because of that. It is reasonable to conclude that in this case, Abrams was acting in violation of the Espionage Act because he attempted to impede the war effort.

See also 
Internationalism (politics)
Nationalism
Pan-Islamism
Anationalism

References 

Political theories
Cosmopolitanism
Internationalism
Anti-nationalism